Carlos Salamanca Caicedo (born 15 January 1983) is a Colombian professional tennis player.

Junior Grand Slam finals

Doubles: 1 (1 title)

Performance timelines

Singles

ATP Challenger and ITF Futures finals

Singles: 25 (16–9)

Doubles: 25 (14–11)

References

External links
 
 
 

1983 births
Living people
Colombian male tennis players
French Open junior champions
Sportspeople from Bogotá
Pan American Games competitors for Colombia
Tennis players at the 2015 Pan American Games
South American Games silver medalists for Colombia
South American Games medalists in tennis
Competitors at the 2014 South American Games
Grand Slam (tennis) champions in boys' doubles
Central American and Caribbean Games medalists in tennis
Central American and Caribbean Games gold medalists for Colombia
Central American and Caribbean Games silver medalists for Colombia
Central American and Caribbean Games bronze medalists for Colombia
Tennis players at the 2007 Pan American Games
21st-century Colombian people